2020-21 Madhya Pradesh Premier League is the first season of the top tier league in the Indian state of Madhya Pradesh. It is organised by Madhya Pradesh Football Association (MPFA).

The inaugural season kicked off on 10 January 2021, with 8 teams competing for the maiden title. On 27 January 2021, Madan Maharaj FC became the  champions of the inaugural edition by defeating Lion's Club 2–0 in the final.

Teams

League table

Knock Out Stage

References

Football in Madhya Pradesh
2020–21 in Indian football leagues